Chuy's is a Tex-Mex restaurant chain established in 1982 in Austin, Texas, by Mike Young and John Zapp.  As of February 2022, Chuy's had close to 100 restaurants in 17 states: Alabama, Arkansas, Colorado, Florida, Georgia, Illinois, Indiana, Kentucky, Louisiana, Missouri, North Carolina, Ohio, Oklahoma, South Carolina, Tennessee, Texas, and Virginia.

Charitable contributions 
Chuy’s Children Giving to Children Parade has annually collected toys to be distributed to underprivileged children via the Operation Blue Santa's city of Austin Police Department not-for-profit organization since 1988.

See also
 List of Mexican restaurants

References

External links

 

Companies based in Austin, Texas
Economy of the Southeastern United States
Economy of the Southwestern United States
Regional restaurant chains in the United States
Mexican restaurants
Companies listed on the Nasdaq
1982 establishments in Texas
Companies established in 1982
Restaurants by type
Restaurants